= Elektronikpraxis =

Elektronik Praxis
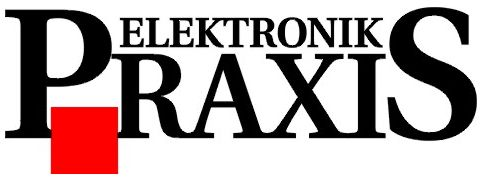
- Elektronik Praxis logo
- Editor: Johann Wiesböck
- Categories: Electronic engineering
- Frequency: Biweekly
- Publisher: Vogel Business Media
- Founded: 1966
- Country: Germany
- Based in: Würzburg
- Language: German
- Website: elektronikpraxis.vogel.de
- ISSN: 0341-5589
- OCLC: 42769847

Elektronikpraxis – Das professionelle Elektronikmagazin (translation Electronic Practice − The professional electronics magazine), also known as Elektronik Praxis, is an industrial electronics magazine. The magazine was launched in 1966 in West Germany as a sister magazine of Elektroteknik.

Elektronik Praxis is published with 24 issues annually (plus special issues) by Vogel Business Media in Würzburg with a circulation of 46,360 copies (2nd quarter of 2006). It has editorial offices in Munich and Würzburg.

Elektronik Praxis is the publication branch of Fachverbandes Elektronik-Design e.V. (FED). The website of the magazine is intended to complement a so-called "Business Efficiency Portal", with additional information to the printed material.
